The gare de Luchon is a railway station in Bagnères-de-Luchon, Occitanie, France. The station is the southern terminus of the Montréjeau–Luchon railway line.

Due to the poor state of the Montréjeau–Luchon railway, operation of the line was suspended starting 18 November 2014, by SNCF and RFF only TER coaches now offer the Montréjeau–Luchon trip, As a consequence, the gare de Luchon is no longer operating.

Train services
The following services used to call at Luchon before the line was suspended:
night service (Lunéa) Paris–Limoges–Muret–Montréjeau–Luchon
local service (TER Midi-Pyrénées) Montréjeau–Luchon

References

Defunct railway stations in Haute-Garonne
Railway stations in France opened in 1873